This an alphabetical list of lakes in Lake County, California includes lakes, ponds, and reservoirs. Numbers in parentheses are Geographic Names Information System feature ids.

 Adobe Reservoir
 Amel Lake
 Blue Lakes
 Blue Slides Lake
 Boggs Lake
 Borax Lake
 Lake Bordeaux	()
 Burger Lake
 Lake Burgundy	()
 Catfish Pond
 Clear Lake
 Detert Reservoir
 Dry Lake
 Eachus Lake
 Hidden Lake
 Hidden Valley Lake
 Highland Springs Reservoir
 Indian Valley Reservoir
 Lakeport Lake	()
 Little Borax Lake
 Lower Blue Lake
 Lower Bohn Lake
 McCreary Lake	()
 Ora Lake
 Pinkeye Lake
 Lake Pillsbury
 Rocky Lake
 Snows Lake
 Stienhart Lakes
 Summit Lake
 Thurston Lake
 Timber Lake
 Tule Lake
 Tule Lake
 Upper Bohn Lake
 Wildcat Lake

See also

 List of lakes in California
 List of lakes in the San Francisco Bay Area
 List of reservoirs and dams in California

References
 

Lakes of Lake County
Lake County, California